The 1954 Tampa Spartans football team represented the University of Tampa in the 1954 college football season. It was the Spartans' 18th season. The team was led by head coach Marcelino Huerta, in his third year, and played their home games at Phillips Field in Tampa, Florida.

Schedule

References

Tampa
Tampa Spartans football seasons
Cigar Bowl champion seasons
Tampa Spartans football